Timothy James Herbert (born 11 July 1941) is an orthopaedic surgeon specializing in hand surgery. He was born in Sheffield (UK). He is known for his work with the scaphoid bone and related invention, the Herbert screw.

He received his medical training at St Bartholomew's Hospital Medical School in London (1959–1964) and his specialty training at St George's Hospital in London, under Alan Graham Apley. Since 1975 he was with the Hand Surgery Unit at St. Luke's Hospital in Sydney, New South Wales, Australia and became Director of that section. He retired in 1996 at the age of 55.

References

Australian orthopaedic surgeons
English surgeons
British orthopaedic surgeons
Living people
1941 births